L'Élixir du Dr Doxey is a Lucky Luke adventure in French, written and illustrated by Morris. It is the seventh title in the original series and was published by Dupuis in 1955, and by Cinebook in English in 2012 as Doc Doxey's Elixir. The album contains two stories of Doc Doxey - Lucky Luke et le Docteur Doxey ("Lucky Luke and Doctor Doxey") and Chasse à l'homme ("Manhunt"). The story is about quackery.

Stories

Lucky Luke et le Docteur Doxey

Synopsis 
Doctor Doxey is an unscrupulous charlatan ready to do anything to sell his worthless elixir. With the help of his henchman, Scraggy, he tries to persuade people in the many cities where he stops that his medicine cures everything. Scraggy disguises himself as a helpless old man or a disabled old woman, swallows the elixir then starts to frolic and jump like a young man of 20 years. Gullible people buy the elixir. Doxey does not hesitate to poison the water of a village to make its inhabitants sick, so that he can cure them with his elixir. Another time, he kidnaps a sheriff who wanted to stop him from doing his "job".

The first time Doxey and Scraggy meet Lucky Luke, they steal Jolly Jumper from him. Luke, who sees a dishonest man in Doxey, decides to trap him. He publishes an article in a newspaper saying that the sheriff had $5,000 with him when he disappeared. Doxey and Scraggy go to the cabin where they put him to take the money from him. But Lucky Luke follows them and catches them in the act.

Characters 

 Samuel Doxey: A charlatan, he travels the United States to sell his worthless elixir. He does not hesitate to use dishonest means to achieve his ends.
 Scraggy: Doxey's accomplice.
 Bull's-Eye Bill: Sheriff of Oxbow Gulch, intent on bringing Doxey to justice.

Chasse à l'homme

Synopsis 
Doctor Doxey escapes from prison, and Lucky Luke sets off in pursuit. After a rough crossing of the desert during which he loses his horse, Doxey arrives at Coyoteville. After quenching his thirst (with a whole keg of beer), he shaves his beard to go unnoticed. In fact, Lucky Luke does not recognize him when he arrives in Coyoteville. Doxey begins again quietly to make his quack trade under the name of Doctor Oxide in front of Luke, who continues not to recognize him. However, when a child draws a false beard on the portrait of his poster, Luke immediately makes the link. He goes to arrest Doxey, but Doxey manages to escape thanks to an explosive.

Momentarily rid of Luke, Doxey tries to sell his elixir to the inhabitants of La Siesta but circumstances and the sheriff prevent him. It is in the neighboring village that Luke manages to catch him and neutralize him.

Characters 

 Samuel Doxey: Escaped from Oxbow Gulch prison, he continues to try to sell his junk to other villages in the region.
 Bull's-Eye Bill: Sheriff of Oxbow Gulch.

References

 Morris publications in Spirou BDoubliées

External links
Official Website 

Comics by Morris (cartoonist)
Lucky Luke albums
1955 graphic novels
Works originally published in Spirou (magazine)
Fraud in fiction
Health fraud